The 2014 BetVictor Welsh Open was a professional ranking snooker tournament that took place between 19 February and 2 March 2014 at the Newport Centre in Newport, Wales. It was the eighth ranking event of the 2013/2014 season, and the second time that BetVictor sponsored the event.

Stephen Maguire was the defending champion, but he lost 3–4 against Joel Walker in the last 16.

Ronnie O'Sullivan won his 26th ranking title by defeating Ding Junhui 9–3 in the final. This was O'Sullivan's third Welsh Open title after 2004 and 2005, to equal the record jointly held by John Higgins and Stephen Hendry. In the last frame of the final O'Sullivan made the 105th official maximum break. This was O'Sullivan's record 12th competitive maximum break.

Prize fund
The total prize money of the event was raised to £300,000 from the previous year's £250,000. The breakdown of prize money for this year is shown below:

Winner: £60,000
Runner-up: £30,000
Semi-finals: £20,000
Quarter-finals: £10,000
Last 16: £5,000
Last 32: £2,500
Last 64: £1,500

Highest break: £2,000
Maximum break: £10,000
Total: £310,000

Main draw

Top half

Section 1

Section 2

Section 3

Section 4

Bottom half

Section 5

Section 6

Section 7

Section 8

Finals

Final

Century breaks

 147, 124, 115, 114, 104, 103, 103, 100  Ronnie O'Sullivan
 142  Shaun Murphy
 139, 128, 121, 121, 118, 114, 109, 108, 104  Ding Junhui
 139  Michael White
 137  John Higgins
 134, 134, 125, 102  Barry Hawkins
 131, 100  Judd Trump
 126  Jamie Burnett
 121, 114, 108  Cao Yupeng
 118  Scott Donaldson
 116  Anthony McGill
 115  Ali Carter
 115  Joe Perry
 114  Jamie Cope
 114  Ross Muir
 114  Mark Joyce
 113, 113  Liang Wenbo
 112, 106, 101  Mark Allen
 112, 104  Neil Robertson
 111  Ken Doherty
 108  Mark Williams
 103  Marco Fu
 102  Noppon Saengkham
 102  Stuart Bingham
 101  Mark King
 101  Joel Walker
 100  Andrew Higginson
 100  Martin Gould
 100  Ben Woollaston

References

External links
 2014 BetVictor 伟德 Welsh Open – Pictures by World Snooker at Facebook
 

2014
Welsh Open
Open (snooker)
Welsh Open snooker in Newport